Extant is an American science fiction drama television series created by Mickey Fisher and, as executive producer, Steven Spielberg. The story revolves around astronaut Molly Woods (Halle Berry) who returns home to her family inexplicably pregnant after 13 months in outer space on a solo mission.

On August 7, 2013, CBS announced that it had placed a 13-episode straight-to-series order, bypassing the traditional pilot stage. Steven Spielberg served as one of the executive producers. Production began in Los Angeles on February 10, 2014. The series was broadcast in the United States on the CBS television network, and was a production of Amblin Television.

Extant premiered on July 9, 2014. On October 9, 2014, CBS renewed Extant for a second season, which premiered on July 1, 2015, and concluded on September 9, 2015. On October 9, 2015, CBS cancelled Extant after two seasons.

Premise

Molly Woods, an astronaut with ISEA (International Space Exploration Agency) is assigned a 13-month solo mission aboard space station Seraphim. She returns home to her husband John, a robotics engineer who created their son Ethan, a prototype android called a "humanich". When Molly discovers that she has mysteriously become pregnant despite years of infertility, she begins a search for answers.

Cast

Main cast
Halle Berry as Molly Woods, an  ISEA astronaut and scientist who mysteriously becomes pregnant after seeing her dead former lover while on the Seraphim space station.
Goran Visnjic as Dr. John Woods, Molly's husband, a robotics engineer heading the Humanichs Project. (season 1, guest season 2)
Pierce Gagnon as Ethan Woods, Molly and John's son, a humanoid robot and the prototype for the Humanichs Project.
Grace Gummer as Julie "Jules" Gelineau, John Woods' assistant on the Humanichs Project.
Hiroyuki Sanada as Hideki Yasumoto, owner of the Yasumoto Corporation. (season 1)
Michael O'Neill as Alan Sparks, Director of ISEA. (season 1)
Camryn Manheim as Dr. Sam Barton, a physician employed by ISEA and Molly's friend. (season 1)
Jeffrey Dean Morgan as James Daniel "JD" Richter (season 2), a cop working special patrol (bounty hunting) who teams up with Molly.

Recurring cast
Tyler Hilton as Charles "Charlie" Arthurs, the Chief Coder on the Humanichs Project alongside Julie.
Lynnanne Zager as the voice of G.I.N.A., the Woods family's personal home A.I. system and helper.
Shannon Merrill Brown as the child "Offspring".

Season 1
Annie Wersching as Femi Dodd, a member of the Yasumoto Corporation Board of Directors. She's highly skeptical of the Humanichs Project and is revealed to be part of Odin's underground group that seeks to eradicate advanced technology from Earth.
Brad Beyer as Harmon Kryger, an ISEA astronaut who saw his dead mother on the Seraphim; he faked his own suicide and now lives in isolation.
Maury Sterling as Gordon Kern, the new deputy director of ISEA.
Sergio Harford as Marcus Dawkins, an astronaut and Molly's deceased lover, who died in the car accident in which he and Molly were involved years ago.
Tessa Ferrer as Katie Sparks, an astronaut and daughter of Alan and Anya Sparks. She died in space under mysterious circumstances.
Louis Gossett Jr. as Quinn, a retired doctor and Molly's undependable, estranged father.
Charlie Bewley as Gavin Hutchinson (alias Odin James), a man Julie begins dating. He secretly leads an underground organization dedicated to eradicating advanced technology, and has targeted the Humanichs Project.
Jeannetta Arnette as Anya Sparks, Alan's ex-wife and mother of Katie.
Adam O'Byrne as Ryan Jackson, the new ISEA Director, replacing Alan Sparks. Kern says Molly can trust him as he was unaware of the conspiracy between Yasumoto and Sparks.
Enver Gjokaj as Sean Glass, an ISEA astronaut.
Jimmy Jean-Louis as Pierre Lyon, a French astronaut.
Eric Martsolf as the voice of B.E.N., the on board, sentient computer aboard the Seraphim.
Owain Yeoman as Dr. Mason, a scientist assigned by Yasumoto to help Molly.

Season 2
Henderson Wade as the adult "Offspring" (known as a "Hybrid" in the second season), now self-christened with the name Ahdu.
Brody Nicholas Lee as the teenage "Offspring".
Mckenna Roberts as Adult Terra 
Genneya Walton as Teenage Terra 
David Morrissey as General Tobias Shepherd, Head of the Global Security Commission. Shepherd has a personal history with Molly Woods, a fact that complicates his work (and his life) in the face of a deadly new threat to humanity.
Necar Zadegan as Shayna Velez (fka Martine), a former Lt. Colonel, now Chief of Staff to Tobias Shepherd. Strong, smart, opinionated, her agenda does not always jibe with her boss's — which may bring her into direct conflict with Molly Woods.
Hilarie Burton as Anna Schaefer, a government operative charged with overseeing the militarization of the Humanichs program.
Kiersey Clemons as Lucy, a more advanced humanoid robot and Ethan's new sister.
Lyndon Smith as Kelsey Richter; JD's estranged and rebellious daughter.
Michael Gladis as Nate Malone; a GSC (Global Security Commission) biologist who works with Molly to crack the genetic code of the hybrids.
Kate Burton as Fiona Stanton, the president of GSC who oversees the progress of Lucy and the Humanichs.
Cleo Anthony as Ares.

Episodes

Season 1 (2014)

Season 2 (2015)

Reception

Critical reception
Extant has received generally favorable reviews. On Metacritic, the first season holds a score of 68 out of 100, based on 31 critics, and season 2 has a score of 63 out of 100, based on 6 critics, indicating "generally favorable" reviews. On Rotten Tomatoes, the first season  holds a "certified fresh" rating of 81% based on 42 reviews, with the consensus reading: "While many of its ideas are clearly borrowed from other sources, Extant benefits from a unique approach to some familiar stories and a strong lead in Halle Berry." The second season holds a "fresh" rating of 73% based on 11 reviews, with the consensus reading: "Extant amps up the action in Season Two, adding much-needed stamina to shore up Halle Berry's compelling performance."

Ratings
Including Live + 3 day (DVR) viewing, the series premiere was watched by 11.88 million viewers and attained an 18-49 rating of 2.2.

Accolades
In 2014, Extant was chosen, along with six others, for the Critics' Choice Television Award for Most Exciting New Series.

Home media releases
On December 16, 2014, CBS Home Entertainment released the first season on DVD and Blu-ray in Region 1. The second season was released on DVD and Blu-ray on December 15, 2015.

Broadcast

The series is available for streaming on Amazon Video devices four days after broadcast on CBS. In Canada, the series premiered on July 9, 2014, on Global Television Network. In Australia, the series premiered on July 13, 2014, on Network Ten. The series premiered in the United Kingdom on July 10, 2014, on Amazon Video. It made its television premiere on January 20, 2015, on Syfy. In New Zealand, it debuted on July 23, 2014, on Prime.

References

External links
 
 
 
 
 

2014 American television series debuts
2015 American television series endings
2010s American drama television series
2010s American science fiction television series
Androids in television
CBS original programming
English-language television shows
Television series about robots
Serial drama television series
Space adventure television series
Television series about space programs
Television series by Amblin Entertainment
Television series by CBS Studios
Television series set in the future